Currently 27 bureaus and offices make up the internal organization of the Central Commission for Discipline Inspection of the Chinese Communist Party.

Internal organization
General Office
Propaganda Department
Organization Department
Research Office
Legislative Office
Office for Improve Party Conduct and Style?
Complaints Office
Office of Central Leading Group for Inspection Work
Laws and Regulations Office
 No. 1 to No. 12 Offices for Discipline Inspection and Supervision (纪检监察室, 12 divisions)
Case Hearing Office
Supervision Integrated Office
International Cooperation Agency
Office for Government Administration
Administrative Office of Party Organs
Bureau of Retired Cadres

 Before 2014 reorganization
 No. 1 to No. 12 Offices for Discipline Inspection and Supervision
Office for Circuit Inspection Work
Research Office
Case Hearing Office
Complaints Office
Supervision Office for Enforcement and Performance
Office for Propaganda and Education
Administrative Bureau of Case Supervision
Laws and Regulations Office
Supervision Integrated Office
Office for the Prevention of Corruption
Foreign Affairs' Bureau
Administrative Office of Party Committee
Bureau of Departmental Affairs Management
Bureau of Retired Cadres
Cadre Office
Theories of Clean Government Research Centre
Information Centre

External links
 Organization of the Central Commission for Discipline Inspection

Central Commission for Discipline Inspection
Organizations established in 1979
1979 establishments in China